John Tomlinson may refer to:
John D. Tomlinson (1929–1992), American politician and businessman
John Tomlinson (footballer) (1934–2014), English footballer
John Tomlinson (educationalist) (1932–2005), British educationalist
John Tomlinson (bass) (born 1946), English opera singer
John Tomlinson, Baron Tomlinson  (born 1939), Lord Tomlinson of Walsall, former MP and MEP
John Tomlinson (comics), comics writer for 2000 AD
John Tomlinson (cricketer) (1926–2010), cricketer 
John Tomlinson (football coach) (1910–2000), known as Ike
John Tomlinson (sport shooter) (born 1933), British Olympic shooter

See also
Jon Tomlinson (born 1973), aerodynamaticist
John Thomlinson (1692–1761), English diarist